Eflapegrastim, sold under the brand names Rolvedon among others, is a long-acting G-CSF analog developed by Hanmi Pharmaceutical and licensed to Spectrum Pharmaceuticals. Eflapegrastim is a leukocyte growth factor. It is used to reduce the risk of febrile neutropenia in people with non-myeloid malignancies receiving myelosuppressive anti-cancer agents.

Eflapegrastim was approved for medical use in the United States in September 2022.

Medical uses 
Eflapegrastim is indicated to decrease the incidence of infection, as manifested by febrile neutropenia, in adults with non-myeloid malignancies receiving myelosuppressive anti-cancer drugs associated with clinically significant incidence of febrile neutropenia.

Its efficacy has been shown to be non-inferior to pegfilgrastim.

References

External links 
 
 
 

Immunostimulants